Adam Wade Gontier (born May 25, 1978) is a Canadian singer and guitarist. He is the lead singer, rhythm guitarist and main songwriter for Saint Asonia, but is best known as the former lead singer, rhythm guitarist, and founding member of the Canadian rock band Three Days Grace. Gontier left Three Days Grace on January 9, 2013. In addition to his work with Three Days Grace and Saint Asonia, he has been involved in collaborations with other bands including Art of Dying, Apocalyptica, Breaking Benjamin and Skillet.

Early life 

Gontier was born in Peterborough, Ontario, Canada on May 25, 1978. He was raised in Markham, Ontario. Shortly after his parents divorced, he moved back to the Peterborough area, where he initially attended Adam Scott Collegiate and Vocational Institute. In 1992, he moved to the Norwood area, and attended Norwood District High School, where he met and befriended Three Days Grace members Neil Sanderson and Brad Walst.

Notable works and collaborations 

Outside of Three Days Grace, Gontier has also written and collaborated with numerous writers, musicians and bands. Some of his collaborations include Daughtry, Ian Thornley, Max Martin, Shaun Morgan, Ben Burnley, Art of Dying, Before the Curtain, and fellow musicians and long time friends Kevin Brown, Grainne Ryan, and Kim Brown.

He has also contributed to a number of other albums. He contributed vocals and musical arrangement on "I Don't Care" on Apocalyptica's album, Worlds Collide in 2007.

Gontier was also featured on the track "Raining" by fellow Canadian band Art of Dying on their album Vices and Virtues. His cousin, Cale Gontier, is the bass player for Art of Dying.

In 2006, Gontier was a member of the rock supergroup Big Dirty Band along with Geddy Lee, Alex Lifeson, Jeff Burrows, Ian Thornley and Care Failure, covering "I Fought the Law", as part of the Trailer Park Boys movie soundtrack.

In 2009, Adam Gontier worked with Daughtry on their second studio album Leave This Town. The song "Back Again" was featured on the physical copy of Daughtry's Leave This Town: The B-Sides EP.

In 2011, Gontier created the record label, Sludge Factory Records, and has signed three acts, one of which is fellow Peterborough band, Before the Curtain.

On January 9, 2013, Gontier resigned from Three Days Grace. He left as the band was about to embark on a co-headlining tour. Matt Walst from My Darkest Days, the brother of bassist Brad Walst, became the new lead singer.

During 2015, Gontier worked with Staind guitarist Mike Mushok on a supergroup called Saint Asonia. The band released their self-titled, debut album on July 31, 2015.

On January 24, 2020, Breaking Benjamin released their compilation album, Aurora, that included Gontier on the track "Dance with the Devil". In 2021, Gontier released a song for PUBG Mobile titled, "Tidal Wave".

Solo career 

Gontier joined singer and songwriter Martin Sexton on the road during his 2012 "Fall Like Rain" tour, providing opening support as a solo artist. He also joined Citizen Cope for a few shows as a solo act. Gontier continued to do shows and concerts as a solo artist. Several songs have been released, but not as singles. In early March 2013, Gontier publicly announced and launched his Adam Gontier Solo Live Tour.

Awards 

Gontier has won two BMI pop awards as well as Billboards "Rock Single of the Year". Michael Bell handed him the "Big Time Award", at the 2012 "Wire Awards". Gontier was inducted into the Norwood District High School Hall of Honor in July 2022 along with Brad and Matt Walst.

Personal life 

Gontier married Naomi Faith Brewer in 2004. The couple divorced in 2013. He married Jeanie Marie Larsen in March 2015.

In 2005, he went into rehabilitation at the CAMH (Centre for Addiction and Mental Health) in Toronto, where he wrote many of the songs for One-X, including "Never Too Late", which was co-written by Adam's ex-wife, Naomi Faith Brewer. Both Gontier and Brewer wrote the video for the song, and she also appears in the video. While in CAMH in Toronto, Gontier wrote "Pain", "Animal I Have Become", "Get Out Alive", "Over and Over", and "Gone Forever". A docu-drama about his addiction, Behind the Pain, was released in 2007.

Gontier has been open about his struggles with mental health. He stated that he relapsed in 2017 and went into a treatment center. Since then, Gontier has been sober and stated that he has "no plans on going back to a dark place anytime soon."

Gontier is a fan of the Toronto Blue Jays and Houston Texans.

Discography 

with Three Days Grace

 Three Days Grace (2003)
 One-X (2006)
 Life Starts Now (2009)
 Transit of Venus (2012)

with Saint Asonia

 Saint Asonia (2015)
 Flawed Design (2019)
 Introvert/Extrovert (2022)

Singles

As lead artist

As featured artist

Other appearances

References

External links 

 Adam Gontier on Myspace

1978 births
Living people
Canadian baritones
Franco-Ontarian people
Canadian rock guitarists
Canadian male guitarists
Canadian rock singers
Musicians from Peterborough, Ontario
Canadian heavy metal singers
Nu metal singers
20th-century Canadian male musicians
21st-century Canadian male musicians
20th-century Canadian male singers
20th-century Canadian guitarists
21st-century Canadian guitarists
21st-century Canadian male singers
Big Dirty Band members
Three Days Grace members
Saint Asonia members